Weddington is an unincorporated community in Washington County, in the U.S. state of Arkansas.

History
A variant name was "". A post office called Wedington was established in 1879, and remained in operation until 1906. The community was named after a local family of pioneer settlers.

References

Unincorporated communities in Washington County, Arkansas